The , commonly called Mount Zaō, are a complex cluster of stratovolcanoes on the border between Yamagata Prefecture and Miyagi Prefecture in Japan. The central volcano of the group includes several lava domes and a tuff cone, Goshiki-dake, which contains a crater lake named "Okama" (御釜). Also known as the "Five Color Pond" (五色沼, goshiki numa) because it changes color depending on the weather, it lies in a crater formed by a volcanic eruption in the 1720s.

One striking feature of Zaō's famous ski resorts is the "snow monsters" (樹氷, Juhyō) that appear in mid-winter.  Strong wind over the nearby lake fling water droplets which freeze against the trees and their branches, until near-horizontal icicles begin to form.  Falling snow settles on the ice formations, and the end result is a grotesque figure of a tree. The effect of a full forest of such trees gives visitors a ghostly impression.  Zaō is one of the 100 famous mountains in Japan.

Rotaria rotatoria  and Pinnularia spp.  are found in the acidic Okama Lake.

See also
 List of mountains in Japan
 List of volcanoes in Japan
 Snow country (Japan)
 Zaō Ropeway

References

External links 

 
 
 Zaozan - Japan Meteorological Agency 
  - Japan Meteorological Agency
 Zao - Geological Survey of Japan 
 Zaozan - Smithsonian Institution: Global Volcanism Program

Mountains of Yamagata Prefecture
Mountains of Miyagi Prefecture
Volcanoes of Honshū
Active volcanoes
Complex volcanoes
Volcanic crater lakes
Volcanoes of Yamagata Prefecture
Volcanoes of Miyagi Prefecture